Steaming is a form of cooking that uses steam as the main heating method.

Steaming may also refer to:

 Soil steam sterilization
 Hay steaming, a method of treating hay to remove airborne dust
 Steam bending, a method of bending wood with steam

 Vaginal steaming, a controversial alternative health treatment
 Steaming (film), a 1985 film directed by Joseph Losey
 Steaming (play), a 1981 play by Nell Dunn
 Steaming (crime), robbery on a train or bus, usually perpetrated by a gang, often violent
 Slow steaming, operating ships at low speeds to save fuel
 A song appearing on Sarah McLachlan's 1988 debut album Touch
 using a steam engine, particularly operating a ship powered by steam

See also
 Steam (disambiguation)